Edmund F. Baroch (born February 22, 1934 in Conroe, Texas - died April 18, 2022 in Summerlin, Nevada), received a Bachelor of Science degree in Metallurgical Engineering from the University of Nevada in 1955 and a Master's Degree in Community Service and Administration from Regis University in 1992.

Among his professional achievements, Ed Baroch was Vice President of Teledyne Wah Chang Corporation in Albany, Oregon, Executive Vice President of International Titanium Inc., and President of Moses Lake Industries both in Washington state.  He was also an instructor at Big Bend Community College in Moses Lake, Washington and later became Director of the Small Business Development Center there.

Work in speciality metals
His work in specialty metal development during his tenure at Wah Chang pioneered many new uses for the nuclear energy, aerospace and defense industries.  Components that he and his team built were used in rocket nozzles for early era space flight including some of the Apollo rockets.  Wah Chang (which means "Great Development" in Chinese) was a pioneering organization in specialty metals production.  Other applications developed for specialty metals during Baroch's time at Wah Chang included:  nuclear reactor cladding, aircraft and aerospace applications, superconductivity wire, cutting tools and chemical processing equipment.

Among his achievements in the field of Specialty metals, he conceived of, and developed the first International Conference for Zirconium in The Nuclear Industry by the American Society for Testing and Materials.  He organized and chaired the Workshop Study Conference on the Use of Zirconium for Nuclear Applications in the Nuclear Industry in Erlangen, Germany in 1979.  In 1983, he was awarded the H.R. 'Russ' Ogden Award by the American Society for Testing and Materials (ASTM).  He is also credited with contributing to the "Kirk-Othmer Encyclopedia of Chemical Technology" published in 2007.  During his time at Wah Chang, Baroch gave numerous presentations around the world visiting technology conferences and forums in US, Canada, Germany, UK, Korea, Japan, France, Norway, Austria and Taiwan.

Later positions
After leaving Wah Chang, Baroch spent some time as an Independent Consultant in the metals field and then was invited to become Executive Vice President of International Titanium Inc in 1981.  He was instrumental in the building of a Titanium production facility in Moses Lake, Washington.

In 1985, Baroch was asked to become President of Moses Lake Industries, a Japanese-owned corporation involved in the manufacture of extremely high purity chemicals for the semiconductor industry.

During his time as Director of the Small Business Development Center at Big Bend Community College in the 1990s, Baroch was asked to make several travels to foreign countries to help build a free market infrastructure.  In 1993, he was asked to join with efforts of Washington State University in traveling to Romania and transforming the key National University and the top technical University, both in Bucharest, Romania, to the concepts of the world economic and governmental realities.  This was less than two years after the Romanian people had overthrown the Communist regime of Ceaușescu.  In 1995, he traveled to the Russian Far East to assist in evaluating the education process for students studying Business Management.  This project was conducted by Portland State University.

Personal life
Ed followed in the footsteps of his Father, Charles T Baroch who was a Mining Engineer across mines in the Western US and also worked in positions within the "US Federal Bureau of Mines".

Humanitarian activities
Ed has also worked in the humanitarian arena with awards from his work with Rotary International and his direct work with Mother Teresa.  Included in his awards is the Rotary International Award "Service above Self" Recognition; the highest award given each year to only 150 Rotarians world-wide out of the more than one million members.  The award is related to achievement in charitable and humanitarian efforts, both in Rotary and beyond.  His work with Mother Teresa culminated in his and his wife Dorothy Hill Baroch's being selected in the 1980s as United States National Co-Links (Co-Chairs) for Mother's Co-Workers of Mother Teresa organization.  Ed and Dorothy traveled several times with Mother Teresa domestically and internationally and Ed volunteered his time in Mother Teresa's "House for the Dying" in Kolkata (Calcutta) India with his son, Steve Baroch.  His work with Rotary led to numerous trips to Guatemala to improve literacy and health for the people of Guatemala.  He became a Rotary International Guatemala Literacy Fellow in 2004, was honored with the Quetzal Award by Cooperative for Education foundation in 2004 and was also presented with the Special Humanitarian Award by the Guatemala del Este Rotary Club in 2006.

Awards 
 1983 Russ Ogden Award. Presented by American Society for Testing and Materials (ASTM). First Award recipient.
 2009 Rotary International Service above Self award.

References

External links 
 coeduc.org
 astm.org
 wahchang.com
 Wah Chang at answers.com
 Edmund G. Baroch at museumstuff.com

1934 births
Living people
People from Conroe, Texas
Vanadium
Zirconium
American metallurgists
University of Nevada alumni
Regis University alumni
People from Albany, Oregon